Innova, S. de R.L. de C.V., doing business as Sky México, is a company that operates a subscription television service in Mexico, Central America and Dominican Republic. It produces TV content, and owns several TV channels. It is one of Mexico's leading pay-TV providers and is owned by Televisa and AT&T Mexico, a subsidiary of AT&T.

History

The Mexican company was founded on 25 July 1996, a joint venture between Sky (formerly British Sky Broadcasting), News Corporation (former owner of 20th Century Fox, now known as 20th Century Studios), Liberty Media and Grupo Televisa and was later launched on 15 December 1996.
During the course of the decade, most Sky operations in Latin America were rebranded to DirecTV, with the exception of the Mexican and Brazilian operations, which absorbed into DirecTV in 2005 but kept the Sky name.

The company also operated a magazines division. There were two prints: SkyView and Sky Premiere. As of 2016, it is unknown what happened to the magazines division. It either went out of print or it was sold to another company and then went unlicensed.

 Sky México is 58.7% owned by Televisa and 41.3% by AT&T Mexico. As of 2016, Sky Mexico has 7.3 million subscribers.

See also
AT&T Mexico
SKY Brasil

References

External links
Sky Mexico
Sky Guatemala
Sky El Salvador
Sky Honduras
Sky Nicaragua
Sky Costa Rica
Sky Panama
Sky Dominican Republic

Satellite television
Former News Corporation subsidiaries
Former Liberty Media subsidiaries
Televisa subsidiaries
DirecTV